Munsu Water Park is a state run water park located in the east of Pyongyang, North Korea, which opened to the public in November 2013.

Completion ceremony 
The park's completion ceremony took place on 15October 2013 and involved the chiefs of the armed forces along with top government officials. Premier of North Korea Pak Pong-ju delivered a speech saying that "The water park is the edifice built thanks to Korean People's Army service personnel's spirit of devotedly carrying out any project and their fighting traits as they are ready to flatten even a high mountain at a go in hearty response to the order of the supreme commander."

Facilities 
The park has indoor and outdoor swimming pools, 14 water slides, a volleyball court, basketball court, a rock-climbing wall, a hair salon, a buffet restaurant, a cafe, and a bar. A life-size statue of Kim Jong-Il stands in the foyer of the indoor swimming pool.

See also 

Tourism in North Korea

References

External links

 360 degree Interactive virtual tour Panorama of the Munsu Water Park

Amusement parks in Pyongyang
Water parks
2013 establishments in North Korea
Amusement parks opened  in 2013